The Abloux is a  long river in the Creuse and Indre  departments in central France. Its source is at Bazelat. It flows generally northwest. It is a right tributary of the Anglin, into which it flows at Prissac.

Communes along its course
This list is ordered from source to mouth: 
Creuse: Bazelat, Azerables, Saint-Sébastien
Indre: Parnac, Éguzon-Chantôme, Bazaiges, Vigoux, Saint-Gilles, Chazelet, Saint-Civran, Sacierges-Saint-Martin, Prissac

References

Rivers of France
Rivers of Nouvelle-Aquitaine
Rivers of Centre-Val de Loire
Rivers of Creuse
Rivers of Indre